"Come and Stay with Me" is a pop song, written by Jackie DeShannon in 1965 for the British singer Marianne Faithfull. It became one of her biggest hits, peaking #4 at United Kingdom.

Background
Faithfull's former manager Tony Calder told Mojo magazine in September 2008 that the song was written in Los Angeles, where he was with Jimmy Page who had an affair with DeShannon: "One night I couldn't get into our hotel room because Jimmy and Jackie DeShannon were shagging. So I yelled, 'When you've finished could you write a song for Marianne?'" DeShannon came up with this song plus with Page an album track, "In My Time of Sorrow."

Charts

Other versions 
 Cher recorded a cover version of the song for her 1965 debut solo album All I Really Want to Do.
 German-American singer Katja Holländer, daughter of composer Friedrich Hollaender, recorded the song with German lyrics as "Immer wenn ich deinen Namen hör" for her 1966 album Hallo, Katja! (Germany only).
 Jackie DeShannon recorded the song herself on her 1968 album Laurel Canyon.

References 

1965 songs
Songs written by Jackie DeShannon
Marianne Faithfull songs
Decca Records singles
1965 singles
Song recordings produced by Andrew Loog Oldham